Soner Hyusein (Bulgarian: Сонер Хюсеин; born 29 April 1998) is a Bulgarian footballer who currently plays as a forward.

References

External links

1998 births
Living people
Bulgarian footballers
First Professional Football League (Bulgaria) players
Bulgarian people of Turkish descent
FC Dunav Ruse players
Association football forwards